Othmar Neulichedl was an Italian luger who competed in the early 1980s. A natural track luger, he won a bronze medal in the men's singles event at the 1981 FIL European Luge Natural Track Championships in Niedernsill, Austria.

References

External links
Natural track European Championships results 1970-2006.

Italian male lugers
Living people
Italian lugers
Year of birth missing (living people)
Sportspeople from Südtirol